FC Nantes won Division 1 season 1994/1995 of the French Association Football League with 79 points and only one defeat.

Participating teams

 Auxerre
 SC Bastia
 Bordeaux
 SM Caen
 AS Cannes
 Le Havre AC
 Lens
 Lille
 Olympique Lyonnais
 FC Martigues
 FC Metz
 AS Monaco
 Montpellier HSC
 FC Nantes Atlantique
 OGC Nice
 Paris Saint-Germain FC
 Stade Rennais FC
 AS Saint-Etienne
 FC Sochaux-Montbéliard
 RC Strasbourg

League table

Promoted from Ligue 2, who will play in Division 1 season 1995/1996
 Olympique Marseille : champion of Ligue 2: Due to financial problems, Olympique Marseille remains in Ligue 2, AS Saint-Etienne is not relegated even though they finished 18th.
 EA Guingamp : runners-up
 FC Gueugnon : third place

Results

Top goalscorers

References

External links
France 1994/95 at Rec.Sport.Soccer Statistics Foundation

Ligue 1 seasons
France
1